(The) Sound Factory may refer to:

 The Sound Factory, a recording studio in Los Angeles
 The Sound Factory Bar, a nightclub that was in New York City's Manhattan
 SoundFactory, a Swedish dance house music duo
 Sound Fantasy, a video game titled Sound Factory during development